Mian Mishk Masjid is an old mosque located in Hyderabad, Telangana, India. It is located near Purana Pul.

History
It was built during the reign of Qutb Shahi period in the 17th century by Mian Mishk, a noble of Abdullah Qutb Shah, the sixth king of Golconda.

The Mosque
It has a garam hamam, which offers a hot bath, complying with the Islamic principle of hygiene and purification.

It is among the 137 heritage list of Hyderabad Urban Development Authority, but is not part of Archaeological Survey of India.

References

History of Hyderabad, India
Mosques in Hyderabad, India
17th-century mosques